New Washington Junior-Senior High School is a middle school and high school located in New Washington, Indiana.

See also
 List of high schools in Indiana
 Southern Athletic Conference of Indiana
 New Washington, Indiana

References

External links
 

Public high schools in Indiana
Education in Clark County, Indiana
Buildings and structures in Clark County, Indiana